Arkhi (lit. "alcohol," sometimes translated as vodka) is a liquor made from airag, fermented milk brandy, or isgelen tarag (or kefir) which then gets distilled. Isgelen tarag often uses the milk of a mare, donkeys, sheep, cows, the yak, camels (specifically, khormog or of reindeer, depending on local traditions or availability. It holds special status in Mongolia and Inner Mongolia, both as the prime spirit of choice among pastoral units and served to esteemed guests.

It is often reserved for the family and never sold in Mongolia, slowly being replaced by vodka, also referred to as arkhi.

In and around Inner Mongolia, it is more regularly produced and sold. Industrial production and bottling occurs in locations such as Chifeng.

References

Bibliography 
 
 

Alcoholic drinks
Distilled drinks
Fermented dairy products
Mongolian cuisine